The Merry Widow  is a 2007 French comedy film directed by Isabelle Mergault and starring Michèle Laroque and Jacques Gamblin.

Plot
Anne-Marie Gratigny is the wife of a famous plastic surgeon, Gilbert. She has a good life, with maids, money, and everything ordinary women would dream of. But her marriage is a total failure. Her husband lives for his job and does not pay proper attention to Anne-Marie. As a result of years of neglect, Mrs. Gratigny has a lover named Leo, who works as a ship builder, and is urging Anne-Marie to leave her husband and this unbearable situation, and go with him to China, where he is seeking a big project for his work. However, after spending an entire day out, planning her departure, when Anne-Marie returns home, she is surprised to find the whole family there, with some very shocking news:  Gilbert has died in a car accident. Relieved that her failed marriage is at an end, Anne-Marie now sees the chance to meet her lover more often, and is looking forward to being able to go to China with him, but all her hopes are dashed by the continuous presence of her family and in particular her son, who won't give her a break, thinking she's in shock because of losing her husband. She now has to pretend to be in mourning and hide her happiness and relief.

Cast
Michèle Laroque as Anne-Marie Gratigny
Jacques Gamblin as Léo Labaume
Wladimir Yordanoff as Gilbert Gratigny
Tom Morton as Christophe Gratigny
Valérie Mairesse as Nicole
Claire Nadeau as Viviane
Éva Darlan as Catherine
Caroline Raynaud as Alexia Gratigny
Paul Crauchet as Gaby Gratigny
Michel Lagueyrie as Michel
Choukri Gabteni as Saadi
Franck Pitiot as Maurice
Fabienne Chaudat as The neighbor

References

External links
 
 
 
 

2007 films
French comedy films
2000s French-language films
Gaumont Film Company films
2000s French films